Stenamma brevicorne is a species of ant in the family Formicidae.

Subspecies
These three subspecies belong to the species Stenamma brevicorne:
 Stenamma brevicorne brevicorne
 Stenamma brevicorne heathi Wheeler
 Stenamma brevicorne sequoiarum Wheeler

References

Further reading

External links

 

Myrmicinae
Articles created by Qbugbot
Insects described in 1886